The Department of Personnel & Administrative Reforms of West Bengal commonly known as PAR is a Bengal government ministry. It is a ministry basically responsible for controlling the Department for IAS, WBCS (Exe), WBSS and other common cadres of the Secretariate. Also acts as the nodal Department for monitoring activities in Administrative Reforms, Redressal of Public Grievances, Implementation of the Right to Information Act, 2005 & the West Bengal Lokayukta Act, 2003.

Ministerial Team 
The ministerial team is headed by the Cabinet Minister for Personnel & Administrative Reforms, who may or may not be supported by Ministers of State. Civil servants are assigned to them to manage the ministers' office and ministry.

The current head of the department is Mamata Banerjee, the Chief Minister of West Bengal.

References 

Administrative reforms in India
Government departments of West Bengal